Livingstone may refer to:
Livingstone (name), a Scottish surname and a given name.
David Livingstone (1813–1873), Scottish physician, missionary and explorer, after whom many other Livingstones are named

Places
Livingstone Falls, on the Congo River
Livingstone, Zambia, a city next to Victoria Falls
Livingstone District, a district in Zambia
Livingstone, Waikato, a suburb of Hamilton, New Zealand
Livingstone, Otago, a settlement in New Zealand's South Island
Livingstone Mountains, Malawi
Shire of Livingstone, a former local government area in Queensland, Australia
Livingstone, Northern Territory, Australia
Livingstone Airfield

Other uses
Livingstone (film), a 1925 British silent biographical film
Livingstone College, North Carolina

See also
David Livingstone Centre, museum in Blantyre, South Lanarkshire, Scotland
Jonathan Livingston Seagull, a book
Livingstonia, Malawi
Livingston (disambiguation)